Frank Fitzgerald was a member of the Wisconsin State Assembly during the 1877 session. Additionally, he was Chairman (similar to Mayor), Assessor and Treasurer of Hartford (town), Wisconsin. He was a Democrat. Fitzgerald was born on August 20, 1824 in County Tipperary, Ireland.

References

Politicians from County Tipperary
Irish emigrants to the United States (before 1923)
People from Hartford, Wisconsin
Mayors of places in Wisconsin
City and town treasurers in the United States
1824 births
Year of death missing
Democratic Party members of the Wisconsin State Assembly